Roy Fisher Hudson (May 16, 1920 – April 15, 1999) was a Canadian politician. He represented the electoral district of Victoria in the Nova Scotia House of Assembly from 1967 to 1974 and from 1980 to 1988. He was a member of the Nova Scotia Progressive Conservative Party.

Hudson was born in Country Harbour, Nova Scotia. He attended Mount Allison University and Dalhousie University, earning a Bachelor of Laws degree. In 1946, he married Noreen Edith Ward. He died on April 15, 1999 at his home in Baddeck, Nova Scotia.

References

1920 births
1999 deaths
Progressive Conservative Association of Nova Scotia MLAs
Members of the Executive Council of Nova Scotia
People from Baddeck, Nova Scotia
People from Guysborough County, Nova Scotia
Dalhousie University alumni
Mount Allison University alumni